Three vessels of the Royal Navy have been named HMS Ambush.

, or Ambush No. 5, was an American gunboat (Gunboat No. 5), launched in 1805, captured at the Battle of Lake Borgne in 1814, and sold in 1815.

Two were submarines:
 , launched in 2011, is an  submarine.

References
Citations

Bibliography

Paullin, Charles Oscar and Frederic Logan Paxson (1914) Guide to the materials in London archives for the history of the United States since 1783. (Carnegie Institution of Washington).

Royal Navy ship names